M146 may refer to:

 M-146 (Michigan highway)
 M146 (Cape Town), a Metropolitan Route in Cape Town, South Africa